The WACO Classic Aircraft Corporation is an American aircraft manufacturer, located in Battle Creek, Michigan. It was founded in 1983 as the Classic Aircraft Corporation and is now called the WACO Aircraft Corporation.

WACO Classic Aircraft builds, in relatively small numbers, a three-seat biplane, the WACO Classic YMF, based upon the original manufacturing plans which were filed by the Waco Aircraft Company with the Library of Congress and thus available. The aircraft are constructed at the W. K. Kellogg Airport in Battle Creek, Michigan. The company also repairs original "classic" WACOs and vintage aircraft.

While the aircraft it builds is a longstanding design, WACO Classic Aircraft has upgraded many systems, such as the brakes, to newer and safer technology. They are built with much of the original hand construction methods and are sought after as a classical open-cockpit aircraft, but with modern digital electronics. To date, Waco Classic only offers one of several models of Wacos that were built. Over 100 new YMF-5C aircraft had been completed by 2007.

In June 2009, the company announced the improved YMF-5D version, powered by a Jacobs R-755-A2  engine. The type was to be type certified in October 2009 and features a new MT-Propeller, a deluxe leather interior, new lightweight carbon fiber wheel pants and fairings, an upgraded avionics package and a cup holder.

In January 2011, the company announced that it would put the Great Lakes Model 2T-1A-1/2 biplane back into production. The aircraft had not been available since 1980. The aircraft incorporates several changes including a larger cockpit and advanced avionics. It is equipped with the Lycoming AEIO-360-B1F6 engine. In May 2012, the company announced that the first production Great Lakes was being constructed and it was completed in June 2013.

In November 2018, the company was acquired by the Florida-based Dimor Group Inc.

Aircraft
Great Lakes Sport Trainer
WACO Classic YMF

References

External links

Aircraft manufacturers of the United States
Companies based in Battle Creek, Michigan
Privately held companies based in Michigan